Manuel Tagaris was a distinguished Byzantine general of the early 14th century, who rose to the rank of megas stratopedarches.

Life 
Manuel Tagaris was of lowly origins—the Tagaris family is first attested in the early years of the 14th century and comprised a handful of members. His valour and ability in the wars against the Turks in Asia Minor won him the esteem of Emperor Andronikos II Palaiologos, who appointed him to the ranks of the aristocracy (he is archaically called a "synkletikos") and even gave him the hand of his niece, Theodora Palaiologina Asanina, a daughter of Tsar Ivan Asen III of Bulgaria, as his second wife. During his long governorship of Philadelphia, he clashed with the local bishops of Philadelphia and Ephesus, Theoleptus and Manuel Gabalas, respectively.

By April 1321, he had risen to the high post of megas stratopedarches at the court in Constantinople, when Andronikos III Palaiologos, the grandson of Andronikos II, fled the capital, marking the beginning of the Byzantine civil war of 1321–28. When Andronikos II ordered him to pursue the prince and arrest him, Tagaris refused, claiming the order to be unenforceable, a view in which he was supported by the Emperor's other advisers. Andronikos II then sent Tagaris back to Philadelphia, which he again defended against a Turkish siege until 1324, when the siege was lifted by Alexios Philanthropenos. In 1329, he was sent to take the field against Orhan, the ruler of the rising Ottoman beylik. He probably died sometime before 1342.

Family 
Manuel married twice, first to a lady of unknown first name, but descended from the Monomachos and Doukas families, and then to Theodora Asenina Palaiologina, daughter of Ivan Asen III of Bulgaria. He had a daughter from the first marriage, and a son, George Tagaris, who also rose to become megas stratopedarches. The future Latin Patriarch of Constantinople Paul Palaiologos Tagaris was also possibly his son, or otherwise a relative.

References

Sources 
 
 
 

13th-century births
14th-century deaths
Year of birth unknown
Year of death unknown
14th-century Byzantine military personnel
Byzantine generals
Byzantine governors
History of Manisa Province
Byzantine people of the Byzantine–Ottoman wars
Megaloi stratopedarchai
Tagaris family